Franklin Hose Company No. 28, also known as Harmony Engine Company No. 6, is a historic fire station located in the Southwest Center City neighborhood of Philadelphia, Pennsylvania. It was originally built about 1849, and considerably altered with a new front in 1868-1869. It is constructed of brick, with an ashlar granite faced first story and a mansard roof. It features round arched window openings and a heavy wood cornice. In February 2010, the building was undergoing renovation.

It was added to the National Register of Historic Places in 1980.

References

Fire stations completed in 1849
Government buildings completed in 1849
Fire stations completed in 1869
Government buildings completed in 1869
Defunct fire stations in Pennsylvania
Fire stations on the National Register of Historic Places in Pennsylvania
Government buildings on the National Register of Historic Places in Philadelphia
Southwest Center City, Philadelphia
1849 establishments in Pennsylvania